Aghcheh Bolagh (also Romanized as Āghcheh Bolāgh; also known as Āqbulāgh, Āq Bulāq, Āqcheh Bolāgh, and Āqjeh Bolāgh) is a village in Hendudur Rural District, Sarband District, Shazand County, Markazi Province, Iran. At the 2006 census, its population was 96, in 26 families.

References 

Populated places in Shazand County